Ancojahua (possibly from Aymara janq'u white, q'awa little river, ditch, crevice, fissure, gap in the earth, "white brook" or "white ravine") is a mountain in the Huanzo mountain range in the Andes of Peru, about  high. It is situated in the Arequipa Region, Condesuyos Province, Cayarani District, and in the La Unión Province, Puyca District. Ancojahua lies south of Condori, southwest of Yana Yana, northeast of  Quelcata and east of Pillune. There is a group of lakes southeast of Ancojahua named Ancascocha (possibly from Quechua for "blue lake").

References 

Mountains of Peru
Mountains of Arequipa Region